The Year Without a Santa Claus is a 1974 stop motion animated Christmas television special produced by Rankin/Bass Productions. The story is based on Phyllis McGinley's 1956 book of the same name. It is narrated by Shirley Booth (her final acting credit before her retirement from acting) and starring the voices of Mickey Rooney, Dick Shawn, and George S. Irving. It was originally broadcast on December 10, 1974, on ABC.

Plot
Santa Claus wakes up with a cold sometime before Christmas in the early 20th century. His doctor, who thinks nobody cares about Santa anymore, advises him to make some changes to his routine, so Santa decides to take a holiday instead of delivering gifts. Mrs. Claus unsuccessfully tries to convince him otherwise, so she enlists two elves named Jingle and Jangle to find proof that people still believe in Santa.

Jingle and Jangle set out with Santa's youngest reindeer Vixen, but are shot down by crossfire between the conflicting Miser Brothers: Snow Miser, who controls the world's cold weather, and Heat Miser, who controls its warm weather. Vixen saves her guardian elves from falling to their doom and they continue on their uncertain path.

Jingle, Jangle, and Vixen come upon Southtown, a small community in the southern United States. They ask a group of children, including a boy named Iggy, if they believe in Santa, but they are skeptical. To make matters worse, Vixen grows sick due to the warm weather and is sent to the local animal shelter after Jingle and Jangle disguise her as a dog. The town's police officer refers them to the town's mayor, who laughs at their story but agrees to free Vixen if they can prove they are elves by making it snow in Southtown on Christmas.

Jingle and Jangle call Mrs. Claus to pick them up. As she leaves, Santa discovers Vixen is missing and travels to Southtown himself to retrieve her while disguised as a civilian named "Klaus". While there, he meets Iggy and his family. Klaus reveals his belief in Santa, and Iggy's father reveals that Santa personally visited him one Christmas, and he still believes as well. When Claus leaves to retrieve Vixen, Iggy realizes his true identity and resolves to help Jingle and Jangle.

Iggy joins Mrs. Claus when she arrives to pick up Jingle and Jangle, and together they visit the Miser Brothers. They ask Snow Miser to send snow to Southtown for a day; he is agreeable but says he cannot as it is part of Heat Miser's territory. They then ask Heat Miser, who says he will only comply if Snow Miser turns the North Pole over to him in exchange. When the brothers begin bickering again, Mrs. Claus goes over their heads and visits their mother, Mother Nature, who convinces her sons to compromise.

As Christmas approaches, the world's children send their own presents to Santa, setting off international headlines. Touched by the outpouring of generosity and appreciation, Santa decides to make his journey after all. On Christmas Eve, he makes a public stop in Southtown during a snowfall. The next day, the children, including Iggy, are delighted to receive their presents. As the special ends, Mrs. Claus narrates that somehow, "yearly, newly, faithfully and truly", Santa always comes. Santa is shown getting out of bed to prepare himself, his reindeer, and his gift-loaded sleigh, remarking he could never imagine "a year without a Santa Claus".

Voice cast
 Shirley Booth as Mrs. Claus
 Mickey Rooney as Santa Claus
 Dick Shawn as Snow Miser
 George S. Irving as Heat Miser
 Bob McFadden as Jingle Bells, Elf Doctor
 Bradley Bolke as Jangle Bells, Police Officer
 Rhoda Mann as Mother Nature, Mrs. Thistlewhite
 Ron Marshall as Mr. Thistlewhite, Mayor of Southtown
 Colin Duffy as Ignatius "Iggy" Thistlewhite
 Noelle Magargle as the Blue Christmas Girl
 The Wee Winter Singers as the Children Choir

Songs
 "Sleigh Ride" (instrumental)
 "The Year Without a Santa Claus"
 "I Could Be Santa Claus"
 "I Believe in Santa Claus"
 "It's Gonna Snow Right Here in Dixie"
 "The Snow Miser Song"
 "The Heat Miser Song"
 "Blue Christmas"
 "Sleigh Ride" (instrumental)
 "Here Comes Santa Claus"
 "The Year Without a Santa Claus (reprise)"

Television rights
The special premiered in 1974 on ABC and aired annually on Freeform during its 25 Days of Christmas programming block until 2017. As of 2018, AMC: American Movie Classics currently airs the special uncut as part of the Best Christmas Ever block. Warner Bros. Entertainment currently distributes the special through their ownership of the post-1974 Rankin/Bass Productions library.

Home video
The special was first released on VHS by Vestron Video on September 5, 1991 as part of their Christmas Classics Series, which is distributed by Family Home Entertainment. Warner Home Video released the special on VHS on September 2, 1992, and re-released it on VHS on September 28, 1999. The special was then released on DVD on October 31, 2000, and re-released on the Deluxe Edition DVD on October 2, 2007. Warner Home Video released the special on Blu-ray on October 5, 2010, making it the first Rankin/Bass production to be released on that format.

DVD details
Release date: October 31, 2000 (Original DVD), January 17, 2004 (30th Anniversary Edition DVD), October 2, 2007 (Deluxe Edition DVD), October 5, 2010 (Blu-ray)
Full Screen
Region: 1
Aspect Ratios: 1.33:1
Audio tracks: English
Special Features:
Rudolph's Shiny New Year
Nestor, The Long-Eared Christmas Donkey
Stop Motion 101 (Deluxe Edition Exclusive)
We Are Santa's Elves: Profiling Arthur Rankin Jr. & Jules Bass (Deluxe Edition Exclusive)

Live-action remake

A live-action remake of The Year Without a Santa Claus premiered on NBC on December 11, 2006, and was released on DVD the following day. The remake stars John Goodman as Santa Claus, Michael McKean as the Snow Miser, and Harvey Fierstein as the Heat Miser. It follows largely the same plot as the original special.

Sequel
A sequel, titled A Miser Brothers' Christmas, was produced in 2008 by Warner Bros. Animation and Cuppa Coffee Studios, and it also used stop-motion animation. Mickey Rooney, age 88, reprised his role as Santa Claus, and George S. Irving, age 86, reprised his role as Heat Miser. Juan Chioran and Catherine Disher replaced Dick Shawn and Shirley Booth as Snow Miser and Mrs. Claus, respectively, Shawn and Booth having died prior to the film's production.

See also
 List of Christmas films
 Santa Claus in film
 List of animated feature films
 List of stop-motion films
 List of Rankin/Bass Productions films

References

External links

Review by critic Jayson Harsin at Blogcritics Magazine

1974 films
1974 animated films
1974 in American television
1974 television specials
1970s animated short films
1970s American television specials
1970s animated television specials
American Broadcasting Company television specials
Christmas television specials
Films about elves
Films scored by Maury Laws
Animated Christmas television specials
Animated films based on children's books
Television shows directed by Jules Bass
Television shows directed by Arthur Rankin Jr.
Films set in the United States
Santa Claus in film
Santa Claus in television
Southern United States in fiction
Stop-motion animated short films
Rankin/Bass Productions television specials
Stop-motion animated television shows
American musical fantasy films
Musical television specials
American Christmas television specials
1970s American films